The Mountains are Smoking (in ) is a novel by the Polish and Ukrainian writer Yaroslav Halan written in Polish in 1938. It was published as a single book by a private Lviv publisher Myśl under the alias Miron Jaro.

The story has been written in the mountain village Nyzhniy Bereziv.

Plot 
The events of the story take place in the early 1920s, in a Hutsul village on the Polish-Romanian border in Pokuttia. Olga, a priest’s daughter, before her father died, makes him promise to marry his friend Martyn Pogodniak, a Polish officer of the local border outpost. However, later she falls in love with the «noble robber» Ivan Semeniuk. Over time they realize that they couldn't live without each other and decide to escape but the robber’s wife Marichka snitches on them to the officer.

Ukrainian editions 

 1956, Kiev, Radiansky Pysmennyk. Translated by Stepan Trofymuk and his wife Oksana.
 1959, Kiev, Dnipro Publishers. The same translation. 50 000 copies.

Adapted Screenplay 

 1989, The Mountains are Smoking (in Ukrainian Гори димлять, two-part TV-movie), by the director Boris Nebieridze, Ukrtelefilm studio.

See also 

 Oleksa Dovbush
 Juraj Jánošík
 Robin Hood

References 

1939 novels
20th-century Polish novels
Polish novels
Polish novels adapted into films